WBCQ is a shortwave radio station operating at Monticello, Maine, United States. The station is owned and operated by Allan Weiner, who also owns and operates WXME AM 780 kHz and WBCQ-FM 94.7 MHz at the shortwave site. WBCQ began operation on September 8, 1998, on 7.415 MHz. The station transmits talk shows and other programs produced by commercial networks as well as former pirate radio broadcasters, including Weiner himself.

Rotatable antenna and 500kW transmitter
In 2018, WBCQ applied for a transmitter license associated with a rotatable antenna, later revealed to be a 500 kW transmitter for an Ampegon rotatable curtain antenna on a single mast.

Acquisition of World Harvest Radio International
In August 2020, it was reported that pending FCC approval, Weiner planned to purchase World Harvest Radio International, the shortwave arm of the Family Broadcasting Corporation.

Frequencies
As of 2020, WBCQ broadcasts on 7.49 MHz (41m band) with a full 24-hour schedule, including original programming in the late-afternoon and evening hours (Eastern time zone); the remaining time is leased to R.G. Stair's Overcomer Ministry. WBCQ also broadcasts on 3.265 MHz (mostly dormant), 6.16 MHz (a secondary frequency that operates evenings), 5.13 MHz ("Radio Angela," a two-hour evening service with eclectic music and spoken word entertainment), and 9.33 MHz (a full-time lease-out to World's Last Chance, a flat-Earth evangelistic society.)

Notable shows
Radio Newyork International
Le Show with Harry Shearer
The Hal Turner Show

References

External links

WLC Radio
WBCQ on Twitter 
Just Right's official website

Shortwave radio stations in the United States
BCQ
Radio stations established in 1998